John Dewhurst may refer to

Sir Christopher John Dewhurst (1920–2006), English gynecologist
Jack Dewhurst (1876–1924), English footballer with Blackburn Rovers and Bury